Bajo el Azul de Tu Misterio is a two-disc album recorded by Mexican rock band Jaguares and was nominated for a Latin Grammy in 2000. The LP was released on September 7, 1999 under the label BMG Entertainment Mexico. The first disc is a live concert album (with some songs from Jaguares' first incarnation, Caifanes); the second disc is a studio album.

Two singles were released from this album, “Tu” and “Fin”, each with music videos.

Track listing 
All songs written by Saul Hernández.

Disc 1 (live)
 Dime Jaguar (Tell me Jaguar) - 5:15
 Cuentame tu vida (Tell me your life) - 5:16
 Las ratas no tienen alas (Rats do not have wings) - 7:46
 Ayer me dijo un ave (Yesterday, a bird told me) - 4:53
 La celula que explota (The exploding cell) - 3:52
 No dejes que... (Don't let...) - 5:23
 Quisiera ser alcohol (I'd like to be alcohol) - 5:47
 De noche todos los gatos son pardos (All cats are grey at night) - 7:50
 El milagro (The miracle) - 4:10
 Nos vamos juntos (We're off together) - 5:30 
 Amarrate a una escoba y vuela lejos (Tie yourself to a broom and fly far away) - 4:37

Disc 2 (studio)
 Hoy (Today) - 5:22
 Fin (End) - 4:27
 Tu (You) - 4:23
 Sangre (Blood) - 5:20
 Parpadea (Blink) - 3:56
 Derritete (Melt) - 4:46
 Mantarraya (Stingray) - 5:55
 Tu Reino (Your kingdom) - 4:48
 Adios (Goodbye) (feat. string arrangements by David Campbell) - 5:13
 No me culpes (Don't blame me) - 3:58

Personnel 
 Saul Hernández — vocals and rhythm guitar
 Alfonso André — drums
 Sabo Romo — bass
 Cesar "El Vampiro" López Garcia — lead guitar
 Jarris Margalli — lead guitar

Sales and certifications

References

1999 albums
Jaguares (band) albums
Albums produced by Greg Ladanyi
1999 live albums
Sony International albums